Mararaba Mubi is a small town in the Hildi district of the Hong local government area of Nigeria. It predominantly consists of the Fulani tribe. It is about 15 kilometres from the town of Mubi. Its main economic activities are farming and petty trading.

History and demographics
Mararaba is a name for the T-junction in the Hausa language widely spoken in the northern part of the country. Another name for the settlement is Kwarhi;  is a Hildi dialect word in the Margi language meaning pathway. It was coined by Arna Gaddo who was the first settler in Mararaba Mubi. He came from Hildi, his hometown, as a result of a misunderstanding with his tribe. When he arrived in Mararaba Mubi, there were no signs of settlement. Among the first settlers were Ulea Nrvi, Jauro Abba, Ahamadu Liyarya and some Fulani and Kilba people including Jauro Ahmadu from Maki and Ahmadu Kila from Mubbula. Mubbula is one of several small Kilba villages and is several kilometers from the town of Hong. It was reported to have been ruled by Tul Hulma, a Cameroonian Nigerian resident who contributed greatly in clearing trees to make the road for the T-junction. Gaga and Jauro Ahmadu worked hard for the development of Mararaba Mubi. Ahmau Kila first settlement was in Uba; he was there for forty years before coming to Mararaba Mubi during the road construction.

Major tribes are the Fulani from Digil as well as the Fali from Vimtim. Names like Nuhu Auwalu Wakili are very common in the state. The Nuhu Wakili family is the ruling family in the town. It is home to the state university, Adamawa State University.

Economy

Mararaba Mubi's Friday market was first started at the T-junction where the former police station was first located, renting Jauro Abba's house. The Friday weekly market attracts many people from nearby towns and villages, generating income. The main products sold at the market are grains, including groundnut, maize, beans, and sugar cane; the majority of the people of Mararaba Mubi are farmers. Modern farming techniques including herbicides and machinery have improved their output and increase the economy substantially. The market is one of the local government's largest weekly sources of income.

Geography

The recent developmental buildings in Mararaba Mubi include the Nigerian National Petroleum Corporation (NNPC) filling station, police station, central mosque, Barazza Hotel, and new private schools and hospitals.

Mararaba Youths Development Association (MYDA) is the strongest association in Mararaba Mubi; it was formed about thirty years ago.

Boko Haram 
See also: Boko Haram

The jihadist group Boko Haram came to Mararaba Mubi on the morning of 29 October 2014. There were shootings and many fled. The group also captured the town of Mubi on the same day. Hunters and military troops helped to regain both cities from Boko Haram after many residents had been gone for over a month.

Populated places in Adamawa State